Mrinal Mukherjee ( – 7 May 2019) was an Indian actor, theatre personality, and music director. He is the father of actor and singer Jojo. He is remembered for his negative roles in Bengali cinema.

Career
In 1955, Mukherjee made his debut with the 1955 film Dui Bon. After that, he performed number of commercial movies more than five decades in Bengali film industry and played crucial roles. He acted with notable directors in number of movies like Galpo Holeo Satti, Nayika Sangbad, Chuti, Shriman Prithviraj etc. He also performed as music director as well as playback singer in Bengali films and worked with Gulzar in the film Mausam. Mukherjee was suffering from liver cancer and died in Kolkata on 7 May 2019.

Partial filmography
 Badsha the King
 Ekai Eksho
 Mayer Anchal
 Paribar
 Surya
 Eri Naam Prem
 Sangharsha
 Tulkalam
 Yoddha: The Warrior 
 Aaghat 
 Barood
 Nayak 
 Khalnayak
 Ek Tukro Chand
 Surya Sakkhi
 Golmaal
 Byomkesh O Chiriyakhana
 Chuti
 Sansar
 Bilambita Lay 
 Sonar Sansar (2002)
Galpo Holeo Satti
Nayika Sangbad
Shriman Prithviraj
 Chiradiner 
 Mon Niye
 Apanjan
 Apan Por
 Aandha Prem
 Khana Baraha
 Dadu No. 1
 JL50

References

External links
 

2019 deaths
Bengali male actors
Male actors in Bengali cinema
Indian male film actors
Bengali musicians
20th-century Indian male singers
20th-century Indian singers
Place of birth missing